In a web browser, the address bar (also location bar or URL bar) is the element that shows the current URL. The user can type a URL into it to navigate to a chosen website. In most modern browsers, non-URLs are automatically sent to a search engine. In a file browser, it serves the same purpose of navigation, but through the file-system hierarchy.

Many address bars offer features like autocomplete and a list of suggestions while the address is being typed in. This auto-completion feature bases its suggestions on the browser's history. Some browsers have keyboard shortcuts to auto-complete an address.

Features 
In addition to the URL, some address bars feature icons showing features or information about the site. For websites using a favicon (a small icon that represents the website), a small icon may be present within the address bar, a generic icon appearing if the website does not specify one. The address bar is also used to show the security status of a web page; various designs are used to distinguish between insecure HTTP and encrypted HTTPS, alongside use of an Extended Validation Certificate, which some websites use to verify their identity.

Most web browsers allow for the use of a search engine if the term typed in is not clearly a URL. This will usually also auto-complete, if the search engine offers this feature, to popular answers, some engines even suggesting answers to basic maths queries. Some browsers, such as Firefox, Opera and Google Chrome, allow for website-specific searches to be set by the user. For example, by associating the shortcut "!w" with Wikipedia, "!w cake" can be entered into the address bar to navigate directly to the Wikipedia article for cake. This feature is standardised for users of the search engine DuckDuckGo as "bangs".

Web browsers often include a feature called Smart Bookmarks. In this feature, the user sets a command that allows for a function (such as searching, editing, or posting) of a website to be expedited. Then, a keyword or term associated with the command is typed into the address bar followed by entering the term afterwards or selecting the command from a list.

In some browsers, such as Opera and Safari, the address bar can double as a progress bar that indicates how much of the contents of the page has been loaded.

Comparisons 
The following sections compare address bar widgets for a few well-known web browsers.

Firefox

Opera

Internet Explorer

Microsoft Edge

See also 
 Combo box

References

Graphical control elements
Graphical user interface elements
Web browsers